The coat of arms of Baja California was adopted in 1956, four years after it became a state (it was a territory before). The sun in the crest represents the state's energy, and contains the text "Trabajo y Justicia Social" (Spanish for "Work and Social Justice").

At the top of the coat of arms is a sun representing the state's energy.
On the left and right are a woman holding a test tube and a man holding a book. Together they are holding lightning bolts, to represent the power of culture and science.
At the bottom is a person with their arms stretched out around farms, factories, gears and fish, to represent the industries of Baja California.

See also
Coat of arms of Mexico

References

External links

Culture of Baja California
Baja California